Litochoro railway station is a railway station in Litohoro, a town in Pieria, Central Macedonia, Greece. The station currently has four platforms, however only are two are currently in regular use. The station is located across the A1 road from the residential area, close to the town centre, and sits around 130m from the shoreline. The stations is also one of the closest active station to Mount Olympus National Monument, and sits in the showdown of the ancient landmark.

History
The station was built in 1916. The original station and the section of line it sat on has since been abandoned. Further upgrades to the line to allow Proastiakos services to access the line followed. It was the terminal of the line from its opening until 7 September 2008, when the line was extended to Larissa. The station has suffered from poor maintenance and Repeat vandalism.

Facilities
The station is staffed with a working ticket office (as of 2019). The station currently has four platforms; however, only two are currently in regular use. There are waiting rooms on platform one and waiting shelters on 2-4. Access to the platforms is via a subway under the lines, however, the station is not equipped with lifts. The platforms have shelters with seating; however, there are no Dot-matrix display departure and arrival screens or timetable poster boards on the platforms. The station, however, does have a buffet. There is also Parking in the forecourt.

Services
It is served by local stopping services to Thessaloniki, Kalambaka and Palaiofarsalos. Since 2008, it has been served by Proastiakos Thessaloniki to Larissa and Thessaloniki. There are around 22 services that call at the station daily.

Station Layout

Gallery

References

Railway stations in Central Macedonia
Railway stations opened in 2007
Buildings and structures in Pieria (regional unit)